Sir Humphrey Vicary Gibbs,  (22 November 19025 November 1990), was the penultimate Governor of the colony of Southern Rhodesia, from 24 October 1964 simply Rhodesia, who served until, and opposed, the Unilateral Declaration of Independence (UDI) in 1965.

Early history

Gibbs was born on 22 November 1902 in England, the third son of The Hon. Herbert Gibbs, later created, in 1923, The 1st Baron Hunsdon of Hunsdon. He was educated at Ludgrove School, Eton and Trinity College, Cambridge. He moved to Southern Rhodesia in 1928, buying a farm at Nyamandhlovu, near Bulawayo.

He became active in farming administration and helped found the National Farmers Union. He was elected to the Legislative Assembly at the general election of 1948 as a United Party member, representing the constituency of Wankie, serving one term before standing down in 1954.

As Governor of Southern Rhodesia

In 1959, Queen Elizabeth II appointed Gibbs as Governor of Southern Rhodesia and appointed him a Knight Commander of the Order of St Michael and St George (KCMG) in 1960.

The Unilateral Declaration of Independence (UDI) by the Rhodesian Front government (under Prime Minister Ian Smith) in November 1965 placed Gibbs in a very difficult position. He was intensely loyal to Rhodesia, and was a close friend of Ian Smith, but he was also equally loyal to his office as the Queen's viceroy.  While understanding what had made Smith's government declare the UDI, Gibbs decided that final legality rested with the Crown, not Smith and his government.

By the time Smith and Deputy Prime Minister Clifford Dupont called on Governor Gibbs after the UDI was signed, Whitehall had directed Gibbs to use his reserve power to dismiss Smith and his entire cabinet from office.  Gibbs complied with the order without hesitation.  He declared that by issuing the UDI, Smith and his government had committed an act of treason.

However, Smith and his ministers simply ignored the dismissal, advising Gibbs that "in view of the new [Rhodesian] constitution…, he no longer has any executive powers in Rhodesia"—and therefore, his power to sack them no longer existed.

Under siege

Several high-ranking officers of the Rhodesian military went to Governor Gibbs earlier in the day, made a statement of loyalty to him, and asked Gibbs to issue a warrant so that they could arrest Smith and Dupont. However, Gibbs knew that the bulk of the officer corps, as well as the rank and file of the Rhodesian military, were solidly behind Smith's government and that such a move would lead to a coup d'état.

Gibbs announced that despite the UDI, he had no intention of resigning his office or leaving Rhodesia, and that therefore, he would remain in Government House in Salisbury as the sole legal representative of Queen Elizabeth II. With few exceptions, the international community continued to recognise him as the Queen's sole legitimate representative in the area—and thus, the only lawful authority in what London maintained was still the colony of Southern Rhodesia.

In response, Smith declared that Government House was only "temporarily occupied" by Gibbs "in a personal capacity", and would be occupied by Dupont once it became available. This action led to four years of harassment and petty afflictions by the Rhodesian government, resulting in making Gibbs and his wife virtually prisoners in Government House, by cutting off his telephone, electricity and water.

It also took away his ceremonial guard and official cars, and sent him bills for the rent of Government House, which he refused to pay. However, his supporters set up a Governor's Fund to pay for the upkeep of the building, and with the assistance of a small staff, led by John Pestell, he managed to remain defiant.

While Gibbs continued to occupy Government House, Dupont and his wife held official receptions at Governor's Lodge in the Salisbury suburb of Highlands. This had previously been used by Gibbs when Southern Rhodesia was part of the Federation of Rhodesia and Nyasaland. During this time, Government House had been the residence of the Governor-General of the Federation.

In 1967, on the second anniversary of UDI, Gibbs declared that his visitors' book would be open to all those who wished to show their loyalty to The Queen, while Dupont, in response, announced that the visitors' book at his office, on the same street, would be open to all those who wished to show their support for UDI.

In June 1969, Gibbs resigned after Smith's government held and won a referendum that year making Rhodesia a republic. He remained in Rhodesia and lived the rest of his life on his farm. Throughout the 1970s he was known for supporting the cause of African nationalism, which brought him into conflict with the government of Ian Smith. Later he was appointed to Her Majesty's Most Honourable Privy Council and was made a Knight Grand Cross of the Royal Victorian Order (GCVO) by Queen Elizabeth II. After independence in 1980 he decided to "stay on" and took up Zimbabwean citizenship.  He stayed on his farm where he had been living since 1970 until 1983 when he moved to Harare in 1983 where he lived until his death in 1990.

Gibbs died in Harare on 5 November 1990, with his funeral held at the Cathedral of St Mary and All Saints, Harare. In 2004 a memorial to Gibbs by Lettering and Sculpture Limited was unveiled in St Paul's Cathedral in London.

Marriage
On 17 January 1934, Gibbs married Molly Peel Nelson (b. 13 July 1912, Johannesburg) in Bulawayo, and they had five sons together. Molly Gibbs (Lady Gibbs from 1960), was appointed as a Commander of the Order of St John of Jerusalem (CStJ) in 1960, and a Dame Commander of the Order of the British Empire (DBE) in 1969. Following Gibbs' death in 1990, Molly Gibbs moved to England and died on 20 January 1997 in Tunbridge Wells, Kent.

Honours

References

1902 births
1990 deaths
Politicians from London
Alumni of Trinity College, Cambridge
Members of the Legislative Assembly of Southern Rhodesia
Governors-General of the Federation of Rhodesia and Nyasaland
Governors of Southern Rhodesia
Knights Commander of the Order of St Michael and St George
Knights Grand Cross of the Royal Victorian Order
Knights of the Order of St John
Members of the Privy Council of the United Kingdom
Officers of the Order of the British Empire
Rhodesian farmers
British emigrants to Southern Rhodesia
Rhodesian politicians
Zimbabwean farmers
Younger sons of barons
Humphrey
People educated at Ludgrove School